Boqchir (also Romanized as Boqchīr) is a village in Jazin Rural District, in the Central District of Bajestan County, Razavi Khorasan Province, Iran. At the 2006 census, its population was 145, in 47 families.

References 

Populated places in Bajestan County